William S. Johnstone (1908 – November 1, 1996) was an American radio and screen actor. He is best known for his voice work as the title character on The Shadow for five seasons from 19381943.

Early years 
William S. Johnstone was born and raised in Brooklyn, New York City, to a Scottish-born father and a German-born mother. Some newspaper publicity said he was born in Paisley, Renfrewshire, Scotland, and came to the United States at age three. He worked as a newspaper reporter before he became an actor.

Career 
Johnstone acted on stage with the Theatre Guild at the beginning of his career, appearing in a number of bit parts. He had supporting roles in 1927 in Fog-Bound and The Manhatters. In 1928, he played the title role in Him, written by E.E. Cummings. Cummings later commented, "William Johnstone made a marvelously attractive unhero ..." He also appeared that year in a lead role in Kate Clugston's These Days.

In 1938, he was selected over 45 other actors to replace Orson Welles as The Shadow on radio. He also starred as Ben Guthrie in the radio version of The Lineup, and became one of the most prolific radio actors of his time, with many supporting roles. He had a memorable role in the ".22 Rifle for Christmas" episode of Dragnet on radio, and reprised it on the television series.  In film, he portrayed John Jacob Astor IV in Titanic, and had a supporting role in Down Three Dark Streets. He played Judge James T. Lowell in As The World Turns on television in a long run from 1956 to 1978.

Johnstone's other roles in radio included those shown in the table below.

He also had supporting roles in Pursuit, Nick Carter, Master Detective, Calamity Jane and Woman from Nowhere.

Personal life 
Johnstone was married to Georgia Brady Johnstone, a former dancer who became friend and secretary to his The Shadow co-star Agnes Moorehead.

Filmography

References

External links

1908 births
1996 deaths
American male radio actors
Male actors from New York City
20th-century American male actors